Sukjong of Goryeo (2 September 1054 – 10 November 1105) (r. 1095–1105) was the 15th ruler of the Goryeo dynasty of Korea.

Sukjong rose to the throne in 1095 upon the abdication of his young nephew, Heonjong.  He oversaw various internal innovations, including the distribution of the country's first brass coins (in 1102) and the construction of the new Southern Capital (Namgyeong, present-day Seoul).

However, he was also faced by threats from without, most notably an 1104 invasion by the northern Jurchen tribes. Unable to repel the Jurchens by force, he sent his general Yun Gwan to raise an army and repulse them. This army is known as Byeolmuban and consisted of three separate divisions. Sukjong died the following year, while on the way to the western capital, Pyongyang. Challenges of Sukjong's reign can be summarized in his own words:

Family
Father: Munjong of Goryeo (고려 문종)
Grandfather: Hyeonjong of Goryeo (고려 현종)
Grandmother: Queen Wonhye (원혜왕후)
Mother: Queen Inye (인예왕후)
Grandfather: Yi Ja-yeon (이자연)
Grandmother: Lady, of the Gyeongju Gim clan (부인 경주 김씨)
Consorts and their Respective issue(s):
Queen Myeongui of the Jeongju Yu clan (명의왕후 유씨; d. 1112)
Crown Prince Wang U (태자 왕우)
Wang Pil, Marquess Sangdang (왕필 상당후)
Wang Jing-eom (왕징엄)
Wang Bo, Duke Daebang (왕보 대방공)
Wang Hyo, Duke Daewon (왕효 대원공)
Wang Seo, Duke Jean (왕서 제안공)
Wang Gyo, Marquess Tongui (왕교 통의후)
Princess Daeryeong (대령궁주)
Princess Heungsu (흥수궁주)
Princess Ansu (안수궁주)
Princess Boknyeong (복녕궁주)
Unknown
Wang Hyeon-eung, Gyeonseongjeokso (왕현응 견성적소 수좌)

See also
List of monarchs of Korea
Goryeo
Sukjong of Joseon

References

 

1054 births
1105 deaths
11th-century Korean monarchs
12th-century Korean monarchs
People from Kaesong